Ruecroft Glacier is a glacier named after George Ruecroft, United States Geological Survey (USGS) cartographic technician in Special Maps Branch, about 1960–84, a specialist in Antarctic mapping.
 

Glaciers of the Ross Dependency